Polythecanthum is a genus of flowering plants belonging to the family Ochnaceae.

Its native range is Cambodia.

Species:
 Polythecanthum cambodianum Pierre ex Tiegh.

References

Ochnaceae
Malpighiales genera